Bence Zámbó (born 17 August 1989, in Celldömölk) is a Hungarian football player who currently plays for FC Ajka.

Club career 
Zámbó began his career in the youth from Győri ETO FC and was promoted to first team in July 2008. He played his first senior game on 23 August 2008 against Kaposvár and is the captain of the reserves Győri ETO FC II.

International career 
Zámbó was capped 26 times and scored two goals for the Hungary U-20 team

Honours

 FIFA U-20 World Cup:
Third place: 2009

References

External links
Stats on HLSZ.hu

1989 births
Living people
People from Celldömölk
Hungarian footballers
Hungary youth international footballers
Association football midfielders
Győri ETO FC players
Diósgyőri VTK players
MTK Budapest FC players
Kaposvári Rákóczi FC players
FC Tatabánya players
FC Ajka players
Lipót SE players
Nemzeti Bajnokság I players
Sportspeople from Vas County